= Deaconry =

Deaconry may refer to:

- a Deacon's status and/or his clerical ministry
- a Cardinal-deaconry, the titular church of a Cardinal-deacon
